= Risana =

- Location within Gauteng Location within South Africa
- Coordinates: 26.257°S 28.087°E
- Country: South Africa
- Province: Gauteng
- Municipality: City of Johannesburg
- Main Place: Johannesburg

Area
  - Total: 0.37 km^{2} (0.14 sq mi)

Population (2011)
  - Total: 762
  - Density: 2,100/km^{2} (5,300/sq mi)

Racial makeup (2011)
  - Black African: 32.1%
  - Coloured: 9.1%
  - Indian/Asian: 9.9%
  - White: 48.2%
  - Other: 0.8%

First languages (2011)
  - English: 50.0%
  - Afrikaans: 19.9%
  - Zulu: 5.5%
  - Xhosa: 2.6%
  - Other: 22.0%
- Time zone: UTC+2 (SAST)
- Postal code (street): 2197

Risana is a suburb of Johannesburg, South Africa. It is located in Region F of the City of Johannesburg Metropolitan Municipality.
